A latching switch is a switch that maintains its state after being activated. A push-to-make, push-to-break switch would therefore be a latching switch – each time you actuate it, whichever state the switch is left in will persist until the switch is actuated again.

Gallery

See also 
 Latching relay
 Toggle switch

References 

Switches